Jomarie Gamboa (born April 25, 1973 in Bacolod) is a retired boxer from the Philippines who was a former 
minimumweight champion.

Professional career

He made his professional debut in 1993. He fought for his first world title in 1996 but was stopped by thai fighter Saman Sorjaturong. He was unsuccessful a further two times in world title fights before winning an interim title fight against Satoru Abe. On 20 August 2000, he fought full champion Noel Arambulet and won on points after Noel was stripped of the belt for failing to make weight. Gamboa ended up losing his belt in his first title defense in December of the same year to Keitaro Hoshino. In 2004 he ended his career. After two more unsuccessful title challenges Gamboa eventually retired in 2004.

See also
List of minimumweight boxing champions
 List of Filipino boxing world champions

External links

Won full title

1973 births
Living people
Light-flyweight boxers
Mini-flyweight boxers
World mini-flyweight boxing champions
World Boxing Association champions
Filipino male boxers